McLean Bogs is a National Natural Landmark containing two small kettle bogs located in Dryden, New York. It was donated to Cornell University by Curtis G. Lloyd in the 1930s, and an  site containing the bogs and surrounding woodlands was declared a National Natural Landmark in May 1983.

The site contains two bogs; one acidic and one alkaline. There are over 66 species of lichens in the bog, primarily corticolous and lignicolous types.

Cornell Botanic Gardens manages the site and restricts public access. One of the key research areas in the bog is to better understand how different types of microbial species creates methane gas in peat bogs.

See also
List of National Natural Landmarks in New York

References

Cornell University
National Natural Landmarks in New York (state)
Protected areas of Tompkins County, New York
Landforms of Tompkins County, New York
Wetlands of New York (state)
Bogs of the United States
Protected areas established in 1983